Murtino is a village in North Macedonia, in the Strumica Municipality. Its FIPS code was MK68.

Notable people 

 Zoran Zaev, Prime Minister of North Macedonia

References 

Villages in Strumica Municipality